Athanasios 'Thanasis' Kanoulas (born 19 February 1992) is a Greek professional footballer who plays as a forward for Greek Gamma Ethniki club Kozani.

Career
Kanoulas started his career in Anagennisi Epanomi, for which he made 19 league appearances and scored 6 goals. On 16 June 2011, he signed for Superleague side Aris. He made his professional debut against Doxa Dramas.

Honours
Veria
Gamma Ethniki: 2018–19
Imathia Cup: 2018–19

References

External links
Aris squad at uefa.com

1992 births
Living people
Footballers from Thessaloniki
Aris Thessaloniki F.C. players
OFI Crete F.C. players
Kozani F.C. players
Super League Greece players
Greek footballers
Association football forwards